These are the games released by the video game publisher Acclaim Entertainment.

1987-1990

1991

1992

1993

1994

1995

1996

1997

1998

1999

2000

2001

2002

2003

2004

Cancelled games 

 
A